Pbxnsip is a software implementation of a telephone private branch exchange (PBX) produced by a company of the same name. Like any PBX, it allows attached telephones to make calls to one another, and to connect to other telephone services including the public switched telephone network (PSTN) and Voice over Internet Protocol (VoIP) services. Its name is a combination of the acronyms PBX and SIP (Session Initiation Protocol).

Pbxnsip is released under a proprietary license with trial versions available on the pbxnsip website. Pbxnsip was acquired on October 4, 2010 by IP Phone maker Snom. Licensing has reportedly not changed. In order to focus on the VoIP handset business in 2012, the IP-PBX product line of Snom technology was spun out into Vodia Networks. The name pbxnsip was dropped in favor of the name "Vodia" which is easier to pronounce.

Originally designed for Linux, pbxnsip now also runs on a variety of different operating systems including Microsoft Windows, Mac OS X and FreeBSD. There are also embedded versions available.

Features
Pbxnsip software includes many features available in traditional PBX systems: voice mail, conference calling, interactive voice response (phone menus), and automatic call distribution.

To attach traditional analogue telephones to a pbxnsip installation, or to connect to PSTN trunk lines, requires the use of a SIP adapter. A number of firms sell PCI cards to attach telephones, telephone lines, T1 and E1 lines, and other analog and digital phone services to a system. Alternatively, a user can use SIP phones and a SIP carrier and use a data network to handle all hardware aspects of connecting telephones.

Pbxnsip can inter-operate with most SIP telephones, acting both as registrar and as a gateway between IP phones and the PSTN. Pbxnsip supports only the SIP protocol (see Comparison of VoIP software for examples).

By supporting a mix of traditional and VoIP telephony services, pbxnsip allows deployers to build new telephone systems, or gradually migrate existing systems to new technologies. Some sites are using pbxnsip servers to replace proprietary PBXes; others to provide additional features (such as voice mail or voice response menus, or virtual call shops) or to reduce costs by carrying long-distance calls over the Internet (toll bypass).

VoIP telephone companies can, as an option, support pbxnsip as a user agent or trunked connection with SIP trunking protocols along with ATAs and other software user agents.

VoIP telephone companies can also support multiple instances of pbxnsip in a multi-tenant mode allowing them to offer Cloud based or "hosted" solutions to businesses.

Security
The PBX has a special focus on security. It was one of the first SIP PBX systems that supported the Secure Real-time Transport Protocol and seems to be robust against forms of Denial of Service, for example the INVITE of Death.

Configuration
There is a graphical user interface (GUI) for pbxnsip which allows administrators to view, edit, and change various aspects of pbxnsip via a web interface.

Regional versions
While initially developed in the United States, pbxnsip has become a popular VOIP PBX worldwide due to its design, extensibility, and excellent feature set. As a result, the American-English female voice prompts for the Interactive voice response and voice mail features of the system have been re-recorded and made available in Danish, Dutch, Spanish, Italian, German, Polish, Greek, French (Both Canadian and French dialects), Swedish, Russian, Brazilian Portuguese, British English, and Turkish.

See also
 Voice modem
 Comparison of VoIP software
 List of SIP software
 IP PBX
 VoIP

References

External links
 pbxnsip wiki
 pbxnsip user forum

Telephone exchanges
Communication software